Gezira, also spelt Al Jazirah, is one of the 18 states of Sudan. The state lies between the Blue Nile and the White Nile in the east-central region of the country.  It has an area of 27,549 km2. The name comes from the Arabic word for island. Wad Madani is the capital of the state. Gezira is known as an irrigated cotton-producing state as it is a well-populated area that is suitable for agriculture.

History

The area was at the southern end of Nubia and little is known about its ancient history and only limited archaeological work has been conducted in this area. It was part of the kingdom of Alodia for several centuries and with that state's collapse in the early sixteenth century, it became the centre of the Funj Sultanate.

Katfia in Gezira was the place where the Wad Habuba Revolt took place in April 1908.

The Gezira Scheme was a program launched in 1925 to foster cotton farming. At that time the Sennar Dam and numerous irrigation canals were built.  Al Jazirah became the Sudan's major agricultural region with more than  under cultivation. The administrative state of Gezira was established on 1 July 1943, after the Blue Nile state was divided into three. The initial development project was semi-private, but the government nationalised it in 1950. Cotton production increased in the 1970s but by the 1990s increased wheat production has supplanted a third of the land formerly seeded with cotton.

References

States of Sudan